Sefideh Khvan (also Romanized as Sefīdeh Khvān and Sefīdah Khvān; also known as Esperaj Khvan, Espareh Khvān, Sefīdeh Khān, and Sefīd Khvān) is a village in Meydan Chay Rural District, in the Central District of Tabriz County, East Azerbaijan Province, Iran. At the 2006 census, its population was 2,213, in 548 families.

References 

Populated places in Tabriz County